We Are the Radical Monarchs is an American documentary film, directed by Linda Goldstein Knowlton and released in 2019. The film profiles the Radical Monarchs, an organization which was founded in Oakland, California as an activist-oriented alternative to the Girl Scouts for young girls of color.

The film premiered at the 2019 South by Southwest festival. It was subsequently screened at the 2019 Inside Out Film and Video Festival, where it won the Audience Award for Best Documentary, and at the Seattle International Film Festival, where it won the award for Best Documentary.

References

External links
 

2019 films
American documentary films
American LGBT-related films
Documentary films about LGBT topics
Lesbian-related films
2019 LGBT-related films
2019 documentary films
2010s English-language films
2010s American films